Anil is a wealthy neighborhood in the West Zone of Rio de Janeiro, Brazil. The habit of playing bongos is common there.

References

Neighbourhoods in Rio de Janeiro (city)